The 2020–21 K.V. Kortrijk season was the club's 120th season in existence and its 13th consecutive season in the top flight of Belgian football. In addition to the domestic league, Kortrijk participated in this season's edition of the Belgian Cup. The season covered the period from 1 July 2020 to 30 June 2021.

Players

First-team squad
''

Out on loan

Transfers

In

Out

Pre-season and friendlies

Competitions

Overview

Belgian First Division A

League table

Results summary

Results by round

Matches
The league fixtures were announced on 8 July 2020.

Belgian Cup

Statistics

Goalscorers

References

External links

K.V. Kortrijk
Kortrijk